Stanovice may refer to following locations in the Czech Republic:
 Stanovice (Karlovy Vary District), a village in Karlovy Vary District, Czech Republic
 Stanovice (Trutnov District), a village in Trutnov District, Czech Republic